Her Chum's Brother is an American silent film produced by Kalem Company and directed by Sidney Olcott with Gene Gauntier, Jack J. Clark and Robert Vignola in the leading roles.

Cast
 Gene Gauntier - 
 Jack J. Clark -
 Robert Vignola -

Production notes
The film was shot in Jacksonville, Florida.

External links
 
 Her Chum's Brother website dedicated to Sidney Olcott

1910 films
Silent American drama films
American silent short films
Films set in Florida
Films shot in Jacksonville, Florida
Films directed by Sidney Olcott
1910 short films
1910 drama films
American black-and-white films
1910s American films